The 1920 New South Wales Rugby Football League premiership was the thirteenth season of Sydney's professional rugby league football club competition, Australia's first. The introduction of a Sydney University side saw nine teams from across the city contest during the season. Balmain were crowned premiers by virtue of finishing the season on top of the League.

Season summary
Due to the 1920 Great Britain Lions tour, from rounds 5 to 8, several players in the NSWRFL were selected to play matches for Metropolis (Sydney), New South Wales and Australia.

In a round 7 game between Glebe and University Frank Burge scored eight tries which remains the standing record for the most tries by an individual in a NSWRL/NRL premiership match. Arthur Oxford set the pace in goal kicking, scoring 29 goals in three games. He also took the record of most goals in succession (23) which would stand until 1978.

The NSWRFL ran the City Cup competition for the second half of the season.

The Balmain Tigers again dominated the season, while University's first year was a disappointment: the Students conceded a whopping 118 tries in thirteen games for a record “tries against” average of 9.08 per match that has not been beaten since. Balmain played consistently and defensively throughout the season except for a slip-up 13–30 loss to Eastern Suburbs in Round 10. Holding a seven-point lead on the premiership ladder with three rounds left to play secured their fifth premiership in six years. The final three rounds were left unplayed and no Finals were contested.

Teams
With the addition of Sydney University's team, the League was again at nine sides. At the end of the season however, Annandale exited the League after eleven seasons, having won only fifteen and drawn four of 126 games since 1912.
 Annandale
 Balmain, formed on January 23, 1908, at Balmain Town Hall
 Eastern Suburbs, formed on January 24, 1908, at Paddington Town Hall
 Glebe, formed on January 9, 1908
 Newtown, formed on January 14, 1908
 North Sydney, formed on February 7, 1908
 South Sydney, formed on January 17, 1908, at Redfern Town Hall
 Western Suburbs, formed on February 4, 1908
 University, formed in 1919 at Sydney University

Ladder

References

External links
 Rugby League Tables - Notes The World of Rugby League
 Rugby League Tables - Season 1920 The World of Rugby League
 Premiership History and Statistics RL1908
 Results: 1911-20 at rabbitohs.com.au

New South Wales Rugby League premiership
Nswrfl Season